Auke van de Kamp (born 31 July 1995) is a Dutch volleyball player for Lüneburg and the Dutch national team.

He participated at the 2017 Men's European Volleyball Championship.

References

1995 births
Living people
Dutch men's volleyball players
People from Zutphen
Sportspeople from Gelderland
21st-century Dutch people